Wabd, is an unincorporated community  in Rockcastle County, Kentucky, United States. It was also called Green Yard. The name refers to the post office founder William A. B. Davis.

It is located on Kentucky Route 1250 just north of its terminus on Kentucky Route 461.

References

Unincorporated communities in Rockcastle County, Kentucky
Unincorporated communities in Kentucky